Bidaragaddi is a village located in Bailhongal Taluk in Belagavi District  in the Northern state of Karnataka, India.

Here Many festivals are Celebrated at season vise.Most Famous jatra is Celebrated in the month of April or May i.e the God of  Shree Durgadevi Jatra since 17th Century.

Kittur Rani Channamma and Krantiveera Sangolli Rayanna was visited and Encouraged the people of Bidaragaddi to Stand Against British Empire.

Many castes are  loving and living together without any discriminating of Caste.

References

Villages in Belagavi district